Gustavo Cruz (born 21 June 1966) is a former Nicaraguan boxer. He competed in the men's bantamweight event at the 1984 Summer Olympics. At the 1984 Summer Olympics, he lost to Star Zulu of Zambia. Cruz also represented Nicaragua at the 1991 Pan American Games.

References

1966 births
Living people
Nicaraguan male boxers
Olympic boxers of Nicaragua
Boxers at the 1984 Summer Olympics
Pan American Games competitors for Nicaragua
Boxers at the 1991 Pan American Games
Place of birth missing (living people)
Bantamweight boxers